This is a complete list of Tunisian international footballers, i.e. association football players who have played for the Tunisia national football team.

List

See also 

 List of leading goalscorers for the Tunisia national football team

Notes

References 

Tunisia national football team
Lists of association football players by national team
Association football player non-biographical articles